Sandy Landsman is a children's book author.  He was born in Great Neck, New York.  He moved to the city to attend Columbia University, where he majored in English. During his senior year, he began entertaining at children's parties as a musical clown.  This became a career for him, along with a cable children's show which he wrote and starred in.  He is the author of the children's books The Gadget Factor (1984), and Castaways on Chimp Island (1986).

References

American clowns
American children's writers
Living people
Year of birth missing (living people)